The Pont-barrage de Monsin ("bridge-dam or bridge-weir" of Monsin), across the Meuse at Liège, Belgium, was inaugurated for the 1930 Liège International Exposition. The new structure permitted the replacement of several locks and to stabilize the course of the Meuse. It incorporates a hydro-electric plant. Work began on the project in 1928, with metal fabrications made locally by Cockerill. It was partly destroyed on 11 May 1940 during the Battle of Belgium.

The dam is topped by a road linking Jupille and the Port of Liège.

Sources
 This article incorporates text translated from the corresponding French Wikipedia article as of October 21, 2010.

References 

Bridges over the Meuse
Bridges in Belgium
Dams in Belgium
Buildings and structures in Liège
Dams completed in 1930
Bridges completed in 1930